Plagiothecium undulatum (vernacular name: wavy-leaved cotton moss) is a species of moss belonging to the family Plagiotheciaceae.

It has a cosmopolitan distribution.

References

Hypnales